CAVIM (Compañía Anónima Venezolana de Industrias Militares or Venezuelan Company of Military Industries in English) is a Venezuelan state-owned firearms manufacturer, which was created by Presidential Decree No. 883 of the then Venezuela President Carlos Andrés Pérez on 29 April 1975.

CAVIM is run by Venezuelan Ministry of People's Power for Defense and its products are used by the National Bolivarian Armed Forces of Venezuela. It's based in Caracas.

History

Firearms
CAVIM manufactured the Zamorana in 2006, which is Venezuela's first indigenous small arm. This was made with some parts from the Czech Republic.

The AK-103 was also licensed to CAVIM for manufacturing in Venezuela with initial licensing fee payments made in 2006 and the transfer of Russian-made AK-103s to Venezuela in 2008. CAVIM's AK-103 factories opened officially in 2012 without the necessary manufacturing equipment. CAVIM-made AK-103s were delivered to the Venezuelan Army in 2013.

Due to trouble with the plant with the Russian contractor failing to meet deadlines with a case of fraud, which forced CAVIM to finish the rest of the construction, full-scale production will start by 2019.

In 2016, CAVIM unveiled the M66 Hunter commando mortar for the Venezuelan Marine Corp.

UAVs
CAVIM unveiled the Arpia, a licensed version of the Qods Mohajer in 2012, although it was first shown restricted to VIPs on November 2011 at the El Libertador Air Base after Iran and Venezuela signed an agreement to purchase the Mojader in 2007.

References

External links
 

Manufacturing companies of Venezuela
Defence companies of Venezuela
Government-owned companies of Venezuela
Manufacturing companies established in 1975
Venezuelan companies established in 1975